Lemna trisulca L. (syn. Staurogeton trisulcus (L.) Schur; star duckweed; ivy-leaved duckweed) is a species of aquatic plants in the arum family Araceae.  It has a subcosmopolitan distribution. Unlike other duckweeds, it has submerged rather than floating fronds, except when flowering or fruiting. Also unlike other duckweeds, a large number of fronds remain attached to each other at a time.

Description
The fronds usually grow submerged and are oblong-lanceolate in shape and are up to 14 mm long. They are blunt at the end and taper to a tail-like stalk at the other.

Distribution

This species is widely distributed in cool-temperate regions, including Great Britain and Ireland, Asia (Bangladesh, China (Northern, Western, Southern [Yunnan]), Taiwan, India (Eastern, Northern), Indonesia (Sumatra, New Guinea), Brunei, Japan, Malaysia, Myanmar, Papua New Guinea, Pakistan, Philippines); Europe; Oceania; N. America; and S. America.

References

External links
Lemna trisulca in Flora of North America

Lemnoideae
Freshwater plants
Plants described in 1753
Taxa named by Carl Linnaeus
Flora of North America